Thomas Saloni (born 17 July 1996) is an Italian footballer.

Club career
He made his Serie B debut for Spezia on 14 October 2017 in a game against Ternana.

On 30 July 2018, he joined Monopoli on loan for the 2018–19 season.

On 17 January 2019, he joined Virtus Francavilla on loan for the second time.

On 13 February 2020, he signed with Serie C club Siena until the end of the 2019–20 season.

References

External links
 
 

Living people
1996 births
People from La Spezia
Footballers from Liguria
Italian footballers
Spezia Calcio players
A.C. Prato players
Carrarese Calcio players
S.S. Monopoli 1966 players
Virtus Francavilla Calcio players
A.C.N. Siena 1904 players
Serie B players
Serie C players
Association football goalkeepers
Sportspeople from the Province of La Spezia